Phú Thuận may refer to several commune-level subdivisions in Vietnam, including

Phú Thuận, District 7, a ward of District 7, Ho Chi Minh City
Phú Thuận, Huế, a ward of Huế
Phú Thuận, Bến Tre, a commune of Bình Đại District
Phú Thuận, Cà Mau, a commune of Phú Tân District, Cà Mau Province
Phú Thuận, Phú Vang, a commune of Phú Vang District in Thừa Thiên-Huế Province
Phú Thuận, An Giang, a commune of Thoại Sơn District

See also
The communes of Phú Thuận A and Phú Thuận B in Hồng Ngự District